The Río de la Mina (Coamo, Puerto Rico) is a river of Puerto Rico.

It is also known as Las Minas River.

It is spanned in Coamo, Puerto Rico by the 1862-built General Méndez Vigo Bridge, which brings what is now Puerto Rico Highway 14 across the river.

See also
List of rivers of Puerto Rico

References

External links
 USGS Hydrologic Unit Map – Caribbean Region (1974)
Rios de Puerto Rico

Rivers of Puerto Rico